The Picola & District Football Netball League is an Australian rules football and netball league affiliated with the AFL Victoria Country.

The league covers a large area of  northern Victoria and  southern New South Wales from Shepparton in the south to Jerilderie in the north and consists of teams from the smaller communities and towns.

History

The original Picola & District Football Association was formed on Saturday 13 May 1905 at the Picola Hotel, with delegates representing the following clubs – Barmah, Koptupna, Moira, Nathalia and Picola present and was active until 1907.

At a meeting of club delegates on Tuesday, 26 May 1908 at the Federal Hall from the – Federal, Koptupna, Moira, Nathalia and Picola football clubs, it was decided to form an association called the Western and Moira Ridings Football Association and was a strong and vibrant competition up until 1933.

At the 1934 annual general meeting of the Western and Moira Football Association it was decided to change the official name of the football association to the Picola & District Football Association. The founding clubs were Barmah, Kotupna, Moira, Nathalia Seconds, Picola, and Yalca North.

Between 1945 and 1958 Nurmukah and Nathalia both field second XVIII sides in the PDFNL.

In 1971 founding clubs Picola and Yalca North merged to form Picola United.

In 1992 Danny Irwin of Waaia kicked 215 goals in a season, which was bettered by Aaron Purcell in 2013 with 222 goals.

In 2006, Dookie United and Shepparton East made their debut with the league.  They were previously in the now defunct Central Goulburn Football League.

Splitting the league
In the 2009 season, the Picola League split into South East and North West divisions based on the geographical location of each club. The league copped a lot of criticism by making this move but has generally been successful and has resulted in reduced travel. The exception has been Wunghnu, which inexplicably was placed in the NW division despite being surrounded by SE division clubs. Wunghnu folded less than two seasons after the split.

In 2014 Tocumwal transferred from the stronger Murray League after struggling to be competitive in that competition.

In 2018 the North West and South East were merged as the PDFNL reduced to one 13 team competition as the PDFNL were not offered affiliation by AFL Golburn Murray as 4 clubs Tungamah, Katandra, Dookie Utd and Shepparton East decided split away wanting to stay affiliated with AFLGM.

In 2019 the Picola & District League re-affiliated with the AFL Goulburn Murray but remained as one division in a 13 team competition.

Current Clubs

Former Club

 Barmah  
 Barmah Federals 
 Barooga
 Dookie United
 Kotupna  
 Lower Moira 
 Moira 
 Moira Ramblers 
 Nathalia
 Nathalia Imperial 
 Numurkah Football Club Seconds
 Picola
 Shepparton East
 Tallygaroopna
 Yalca North
 Wunghnu

Picola & DFNL Premiers
Senior Football

1934   Barmah
1935   Picola
1936   Strathmerton
1937   Strathmerton
1938   Barmah
1939   Yalca North
1940   Moira
1941   No competition
1942   No competition
1943   No competition
1944   No competition
1945   No competition
1946   Moira
1947   Nathalia Seconds
1948   Moira
1949   Picola
1950   Katamatite
1951   Numurkah Seconds
1952   Picola
1953   Waaia
1954   Picola
1955   Picola
1956   Picola
1957   Moira
1958   Wunghnu
1959   Barooga
1960   Barooga
1961   Barooga
1962   Picola
1963   Yarroweyah
1964   Wunghnu
1965   Wunghnu
1966   Wunghnu
1967   Picola
1968   Katunga
1969   Blighty
1970   Yarroweyah
1971   Blighty
1972   Yarroweyah
1973   Wunghnu
1974   Waaia
1975   Blighty
1976   Barooga
1977   Katunga
1978 – Barooga 
1979 – Barooga
1980 – Yarroweyah
1981 – Barooga
1982 – Barooga
1983 – Katunga
1984 – Katunga
1985 – Yarroweyah
1986 – Barooga
1987 – Barooga
1988 – Yarroweyah
1989 – Waaia
1990 – Waaia 
1991 – Waaia 
1992 – Waaia 
1993 – Mathoura 
1994 – Waaia 
1995 – Waaia 
1996 – Katamatite 
1997 – Strathmerton
1998 – Katandra 
1999 – Tungamah 
2000 – Blighty 
2001 – Katamatite 
2002 – Waaia 
2003 – Katandra 
2004 – Katandra 
2005 – Waaia 
2006 – Shepparton East 
2007 – Dookie United 
2008 – Tungamah 
2009
North West – Jerilderie 
South East – Tungamah 
2010
North West – Strathmerton 
South East – Shepparton East 
2011
North West – Berrigan 
South East – Rennie 
2012
North West – Jerilderie 
South East – Shepparton East  
2013
North West – Jerilderie 
South East – Tungamah 
2014
North West – Jerilderie 
South East – Tungamah 
2015
North West – Strathmerton 
South East – Tungamah
2016
 North West – Picola United
 South East – Shepparton East
2017
 North West – Picola United
 South East – Rennie
2018 – Rennie
2019 – Strathmerton
2020 League in recess due to COVID19 pandemic

Picola & DFL – Best & Fairest – Pearce Medal
Senior Football

1978: R Adkins – Waaia
1979: 
1980:
1981:C Mattox - Barooga
1982:
1983:
1984:
1985:
1986:
1987:
1988:
1989:
1990: C Duggan – Mathoura
1991: A Wilson – Waaia
1992: W Jackson – Katunga
1993: S Joyce – Wunghnu
1994: S Gilligan – Deniliquin Rovers & 
1994: S Joyce – Wunghnu
1995: S Gilligan – Deniliquin Rovers
1996: M Collins – Katamatite
1997: Bj Ryan – Strathmerton
1998: D Sexton – Blighty
1999: D Sexton – Blighty
2000: D Jenkins – Katunga
2001: D Sexton – Blighty
2002: A Waasdorp – Waaia
2003: H Yelland – Berrigan
2004: A Waasdorp – Yarroweyah
2005: A Brunt – Picola United
2006: A Brunt – Picola United
2007: M Wellington – Katunga
2008: S Scott – Waaia
2009
North West: A May – Deniliquin Rovers
South East: J Wild – Katamatite
2010
North West: M Gorman – Berrigan
South East: R Frappell – Shepparton East
2011
North West: M Gorman – Berrigan
South East: L Cowan – Waaia
2012
North West: J Evans – Strathmerton
South East: N Doyle – Tungamah
2013
North West: C.Marshall – 
South East: N Doyle – Tungamah
2014
North West:  A May – Jerilderie
South East: L.Minogue – Katandra  & T.Saunders - Katamatite 
2015
North West: Paul Massingham – Berrigan
South East: M McCarty – Waaia & N Doyle – Tungamah
2016
 North West:
 South East:
2017
 North West:
 South East:
2018: 
2019: John Woodcock - Katamatite

Football Association / League Name History

 1897 – Murray River District Football Association (MRDFA); 
 1898 & 1889 – Nathalia and District Football Association (NDFA); 
 1900 to 1903 – Barmah Central Football Association (BCFA); 
 1904 – Nathalia and District Football Association (NDFA); 
 1905 to 1907 – Picola and District Football Association (PDFA); 
 1908 to 1933 – Western and Moira Ridings Football Association (WMRFA); 
 1934 to 1946 – Picola and District Football Association (PDFA); 
 1947 to present – Picola and District Football League (PDFL)

Seasons

2008 season 
LADDER

FINALS

2009 season

North West Division

South East Division

2010 season

North West Division

South East Division

2011 season

North West Division

South East  Division

2012 season

North West Division

South East Division

2013 season

North West Division

South East Division

2014 season

North West Division

South East Division

2015 Ladder

North West Division

South East Division

2016 Ladder

North West Division

South East Division

2017 Ladder

North West Division

South East Division

References

External links
 

Picola & District Football League
Australian rules football competitions in Victoria (Australia)
Australian rules football competitions in New South Wales
Netball leagues in Victoria (Australia)
Netball leagues in New South Wales
1934 establishments in Australia
Sport in the Riverina